Tom Ljungman (born 29 May 1991) is a Swedish television and film actor.

Early life
Born Thomas Kjell Ljungman in Stockholm, Sweden on 29 May 1991. He is the son of TV 3 personality Jonny Ljungman and lives in Skarpnäck borough in south Stockholm.

Career
His first acting role was in Errol in 2003. He is best known for his roles in television series De halvt dolda and as Foppa in Livet enligt Rosa. Ljungman appeared as a 16-year-old dead shot on a mission in the 2009 Wallander episode The Sniper.

On the big screen, he is best known for his role as Patrik, a 15-year-old troubled adolescent in the 2008 Swedish gay comedy film Patrik, Age 1.5 directed by Ella Lemhagen.

Filmography

Films
2012 - Johan Falk Barninfiltratören as Ricky
2012 - Jävla pojkar as Kristoffer
2011 = Kronjuvelerna as Jésus Fernandez (voice)
2011 - With Every Heartbeat (Swedish: Kyss mig) as Oskar 
2011 - Jag saknar dig as Stefan
2008 - Patrik, Age 1.5 (Swedish: Patrik 1,5) as Patrik
2010 - 7X - lika barn leka bäst as Morgan 
2008 - Let the Right One In (Swedish: Låt den rätte komma in)

Television
2019 - Gåsmamman as Janusz Thuchlin
2019 - Innan vi dör as Fevsi
2019 - Dröm as Vuxna Hjalmar
2016 - Juicebaren
2014 - Viva Hate as Daniel 
2013 - Fjällbackamorden: Strandridaren  as Ante
2012 - Jägaren  as Jonas
2011 - Maria Wern as Tom
2009 - Wallander as Skytten (The Sniper)
2009 - De halvt dolda as Linus
2009 - Fallet - del 2 (Skotten i Rödeby) as Micke
2008 - Oskyldigt dömd as Oskar Karlsson
2005 - Livet enligt Rosa as Foppa 
2005 - Länge leve Lennart as Tommy 
2004 - Pappa Jansson as Arvid 
2003 - Errol as Errol

External links 
 
 Swedish Film Database

Swedish male actors
1991 births
Living people